Philareta was a genus of moths of the family Noctuidae, it is now considered a synonym of Chazaria.

References
Natural History Museum Lepidoptera genus database

Heliothinae